The Claytor Dam is a gravity dam on the New River in Pulaski County, Virginia, United States. It is named after William Graham Claytor, then vice president of Appalachian Power Company (APC), who was instrumental in the dam's construction. APC is now a subsidiary of American Electric Power (AEP) who owns the dam. The primary purpose of the dam is hydroelectric power generation and it supports a 75 MW power station. Its reservoir, Claytor Lake, is also used for recreation. The dam was constructed and its power station commissioned in 1939. It received its first license in 1943.

References

Dams in Virginia
Gravity dams
Hydroelectric power plants in Virginia
Energy infrastructure completed in 1939
Dams completed in 1939
Buildings and structures in Pulaski County, Virginia
1939 establishments in Virginia
American Electric Power